Haidao Township is an insular township off the Asian mainland in Xiapu County, Ningde, Fujian, China (PRC). The township is immediately north of present-day Lienchiang County (the Matsu Islands), ROC (Taiwan).

History
On December 15, 1950, the Matsu Administrative Office of Fujian Province, Republic of China was established including modern-day Lienchiang County (the Matsu Islands), ROC (Taiwan) as well as islands in present-day Haidao Township including the Sishuang Islands, Xiyang, and Fuying as well as Taishan in present-day Shacheng, Fuding.

On December 29, 1950, the Daxiyang Island was attacked by Chinese Communist forces and defended by guerrilla forces.

On July 27, 1951, ten motorized with over four hundred Chinese Communist soldiers attacked Xiyang Island. More than sixty guerrilla soldiers defending the island died. Xiyang District leader Li Kuei-Yu and Sishuang District leader Wang Chen-Chi died in a grenade attack. The attacking force retreated.

In early July 1953, Chinese Nationalist guerillas retreated from islands in the Xiyang Island (Chihchutao) area. The area came under the control of Chinese Communists on July 13, 1953.

On November 29, 1954, Haidao District was established.

In 1958, Haidao Commune was established.

In 1984, Haidao Township was established.

In August 2012, the Haidao Township, Xiapu County Uninhabited Island Environmental Protection Volunteer Service Unit, forerunner of the Xiapu County Island Environmental Protection Organization, was established.

In March 2016, a woman was murdered in Beishuang Village and two suspects were apprehended.

From May 25 to 27, 2018, the 2018 Xiapu, China Ocean Fishing Competition was held in the Sishuang islands.

In late April 2019, representatives from the nearby Dongyin Township's government (ROC) visited Haidao Township.

Geography
Islands in Haidao Township include:
Xiyang Island, also known as Spider Island (Zhizhu Island, Chihchu Island, Chih-chu Tao) 
Fuying Island, also known as Double Peak Island (Shuangfeng Island) 
the Sishuang Islands (Sishuang Liedao, Pei-shuang Lieh-tao)
 Beishuang Island (Pei-shuang) 
 Dongshuang Island (Tung-shuang) 
 Xishuang Island (Hsi-shuang) 
 Nanshuang Island (Nan-shuang) 
Xiaoxiyang Island, also known as Isthmus Island (Yisimasi Island, I-ssu-ma-ssu Tao) 
Kuishan Island (Kuishan Dao), also known as Zhuishan (Chui Shan) 
Maci Island (Ma Chick) 
Nigu Island (Nu Geu Sen) 
Wu Island (Inside Island) 
Ma'an Island 
Dadong Island 

The Sishuang islands are north-northwest of Dongyin Township, Lienchiang County (the Matsu Islands), ROC (Taiwan).

Xiyang and Fuying Island are divided from mainland Asia by the Xiao'an Channel (Xiao'an Shuidao, Hsiao An Shui Tao).

Administrative divisions
Haidao Township includes six villages centered on three of the islands:

Xiyang Island:
Gongdong, Gongxi and Yantai

Fuying Island:
 Li'ao and Wen'ao

Beishuang Island:
Beishuang

Demographics

Economy
Most of the residents are involved in fishing-related work.

Gallery

See also
 List of islands of China

References

External links

霞浦千里海疆行27之《海岛人家》 ('People of the Sea Part 27: Visit to Xiapu's Thousand-li Coastal Frontier')

Township-level divisions of Fujian